Patriots Park may refer to:

 Patriots Park (Bakersfield), a public park in Bakersfield, California
 Patriots Park (Columbia County, Georgia), a multi-purpose recreational facility
 Patriot's Park, Westchester County, New York